Richard Plantagenet Temple-Nugent-Brydges-Chandos-Grenville, 2nd Duke of Buckingham and Chandos,  (11 February 1797 – 29 July 1861), styled Viscount Cobham from birth until 1813, Earl Temple between 1813 and 1822 and Marquess of Chandos between 1822 and 1839, was a British Tory politician. He served as Lord Privy Seal between 1841 and 1842.

Two events in his life were remarkable, given the era he lived in and the position he held in society as a duke: firstly, he obtained a divorce at a time when it required an Act of Parliament; secondly, despite the great wealth to which he was born, he declared bankruptcy with debts of over a million pounds in 1847.

Background and education
Born at Stowe, Buckinghamshire, the Duke of Buckingham and Chandos was the son of the Richard Nugent-Temple-Grenville, Earl Temple (later created the Duke of Buckingham and Chandos) and Lady Anne Brydges, the only surviving child of the 3rd Duke of Chandos. In addition to being the Duchess of Buckingham and Chandos, Lady Anne was suo jure Lady Kinloss. In 1799, Richard Temple-Nugent-Grenville changed the already triple-barrelled family name to Temple-Nugent-Brydges-Chandos-Grenville by royal license to reflect his wife's family.

The second Duke was a paternal grandson of the 1st Marquess of Buckingham and a great-grandson of Prime Minister George Grenville. He was educated at Eton and Oriel College, Oxford.

Political career
Buckingham sat as Member of Parliament for Buckinghamshire between 1818 and 1839, when he succeeded his father in the dukedom and entered the House of Lords. Two years later, in September 1841, he was sworn of the Privy Council and appointed Lord Privy Seal by Sir Robert Peel, a post he held only until February 1842. He was appointed a Knight Grand Cross of the Royal Hanoverian Order in 1835, elected a Fellow of the Society of Antiquaries in 1840 and made a Knight of the Garter in 1842.

Slave ownership
According to the Centre for the Study of the Legacies of British Slave-ownership at University College London, Buckingham was the beneficiary of payment due to him as a slave owner in the aftermath of the Slavery Abolition Act 1833.

Buckingham was associated with "T71/865 St Andrew claim no. 114 (Hope Estate)", for 379 slaves in Jamaica. The claim was made by his father, the 1st Duke of Buckingham and Chandos, but it was denied, as it was subject to a marriage settlement for the heir and his wife. The compensation was instead awarded to the Trustees of that settlement, who received a £6,630 payment at the time, to the 2nd Duke's benefit.

Financial affairs
In 1847, eight years after succeeding his father as Duke of Buckingham and Chandos, the second Duke was declared bankrupt, with debts over a million pounds (£ as of ). This occasioned the sale of his Keynsham estate in Somerset in 1841, Avington Park in 1847 and ultimately the auction sale of the contents of the main family seat at Stowe House in August–September 1848, one of the handful of most prominent English country house contents auctions of the 19th century. The financial ruin of so prominent a member of the aristocracy, who had inherited an income of more than £70,000, a vast fortune at the time, became a national sensation.

Personal life
In 1819, Buckingham married Lady Mary Campbell, daughter of Lieut-Gen The 4th Earl of Breadalbane (later created Marquess of Breadalbane). They had one son, Richard, 3rd Duke of Buckingham and Chandos, and one daughter, Lady Anna, but were divorced in 1850 after Buckingham had lost his inheritance. Anna went to campaign for women's rights. At that time, divorce required an Act of Parliament.

Buckingham died at the Great Western Hotel, Paddington, London, in July 1861, aged 64, and was succeeded in the dukedom by his only son. His former wife died less than a year later in June 1862, aged 66.

References

Bibliography

External links
Memoirs of the Court and Cabinets of George the Third, Volume 1 (of 2)
Memoirs of the Court and Cabinets of George the Third, Volume 2 (of 2)
 
 
 

1797 births
1861 deaths
People educated at Eton College
Alumni of Oriel College, Oxford
1
Earls Nugent
Earls Temple of Stowe
Richard
Knights of the Garter
Lords Privy Seal
Chandos, Richard Temple-Grenville, Marquess of
People from Aylesbury Vale
Members of the Privy Council of the United Kingdom
UK MPs 1818–1820
UK MPs 1820–1826
UK MPs 1826–1830
UK MPs 1830–1831
UK MPs 1831–1832
UK MPs 1832–1835
UK MPs 1835–1837
UK MPs 1837–1841
Buckingham and Chandos, D2
Richard
Fellows of the Society of Antiquaries of London
Recipients of payments from the Slavery Abolition Act 1833